Eadfrith of Leominster also known as Eadridus was a seventh century Catholic saint from Anglo-Saxon England. Although very little is known of his early life, he is an important figure in the process of Christianisation of Anglo-Saxon England.

Eadfrith came from Northumbria and worked as a missionary to the Hwicce kingdom and in 660 converted King Merewalh of the Hwicce, a contemporary (and possibly son) of King Penda of Mercia.

Around 660 Eadfrith also founded Leominster Abbey for women, as a conventual priory of the monks of Reading Abbey. This abbey was mentioned in the Domesday Book and was re-founded about 1139. at which time it may have been associated with the royal family.

Eadfrith is known to history mainly through the hagiography of the Secgan Manuscript, but also the Anglo-Saxon Chronicle and the Catalogus sanctorum pausantium in Anglia.

Eadfrith died in 675 and was buried in Leominster. His feast day is on 26 October.

References

7th-century Christian saints
Medieval English saints
Anglo-Saxon saints
Christian hagiography
Old English literature
English toponymy
7th-century English people